The Los Angeles Kings are a professional ice hockey franchise based in Los Angeles, California. They play in the Pacific Division of the Western Conference in the National Hockey League (NHL). The franchise was founded in 1967.  Since arriving in Los Angeles, the Kings have drafted 463 players. The 2020 draft was the 54th in which Los Angeles participated.

The NHL Entry Draft is held each June, allowing teams to select players who have turned 18 years old by September 15 in the year the draft is held. The draft order is determined by the previous season's order of finish, with non-playoff teams drafting first, followed by the teams that made the playoffs, with the specific order determined by the number of points earned by each team.  The NHL holds a weighted lottery for the 14 non-playoff teams, the winner of the lottery will pick first overall as of 2013. Prior to 2013, the winning team could only move up a maximum of four positions in the entry draft. The team with the fewest points has the best chance of winning the lottery, with each successive team given a lower chance of moving up in the draft. The Kings have won the lottery once in 1995 – the team moved up from the seventh pick overall to the third pick, which they used to select Aki Berg. Between 1986 and 1994, the NHL also held a Supplemental Draft for players in American colleges.

Los Angeles' first draft pick was Rick Pagnutti, taken first overall in the 1967 NHL Amateur Draft; this is also the highest pick that Los Angeles has ever drafted. Thirteen picks went on to play over 1,000 NHL games: Larry Murphy, Luc Robitaille, Darryl Sydor, Martin Gelinas, Rob Blake, Garry Galley, Bernie Nicholls, Dave Taylor, Butch Goring, Jay Wells, Olli Jokinen, Alexei Zhitnik, and Kimmo Timonen. Four of Los Angeles' draft picks, Billy Smith, Larry Murphy, Luc Robitaille, and Rob Blake, have been elected to the Hockey Hall of Fame. Kings' 1984 draft pick Tom Glavine was also drafted by Major League Baseball (MLB)'s Atlanta Braves, choosing a career in the MLB over the NHL.

Key

Draft picks

''Statistics are complete as of the 2021–22 NHL season and show each player's career regular season totals in the NHL. Wins, losses, ties, overtime losses and goals against average apply to goaltenders and are used only for players at that position. This list includes players drafted by the team in Los Angeles only.

See also
List of Los Angeles Kings players
1967 NHL Expansion Draft

References

 
 
 

draft picks
 
Los Angeles Kings